Kwesi Akwansah Andam (15 December 1946 – 14 December 2007) was a Ghanaian academic and former Vice Chancellor of the Kwame Nkrumah University of Science and Technology. He was a professor of engineering. He died on 14 December 2007 at the 37 Military Hospital.

Early life and education
Prof. Andam was born at Ekumfi Atakwaa in the Central Region of Ghana 15 December 1946. He obtained his secondary school certificate from Ghana Secondary Technical School at Takoradi in the Western Region of Ghana. He obtained a Bachelor of Science degree in Civil Engineering from the Kwame Nkrumah University of Science and Technology. Prof. Andam obtained his PhD in Structural Engineering Computer Aided Design (CAD) Division at Newcastle University, Newcastle upon Tyne in the United Kingdom.

Career
In 1985, he was appointed a lecturer at the Civil Engineering Department of KNUST. He became a senior lecturer in 1985. He became an associate professor in 1992 and a full professor in 1997.

Vice Chancellor of KNUST
Andam was appointed as the Vice Chancellor of KNUST by the governing board of the university. His four-year term started in September 2002 and ended in September 2006.

Personal life
He was married to Professor Aba Andam who is a physicist and an academic. They had four children. He died on 14 December 2007 at the 37 Military Hospital after a short illness.

Publications
Andam authored over 100 science books and papers.

References

2007 deaths
Academic staff of Kwame Nkrumah University of Science and Technology
Vice-Chancellors of the Kwame Nkrumah University of Science and Technology
Vice-Chancellors of universities in Ghana
20th-century Ghanaian engineers
Kwame Nkrumah University of Science and Technology alumni
Ghana Secondary Technical School alumni
1946 births
Ghanaian scientists
Fellows of the African Academy of Sciences